This was the first edition of the tournament. The tournament was canceled prior to completion due to the coronavirus pandemic.

Seeds

Draw

Finals

Top half

Bottom half

References

External links
Main draw
Qualifying draw

Potchefstroom Open - Singles
Potchefstroom Open - Singles